Giorgos Stathakis (born 8 November 1953) is a Greek politician and economist. From 27 January to 28 August 2015, he served as the Minister of Economy, Infrastructure, Shipping and Tourism in the cabinet of Alexis Tsipras. He has also been a Member of the Hellenic Parliament for Chania since May 2012.

Stathakis is a professor of political economy at the University of Crete, but has been on leave since being elected as an MP. He was formerly a Vice-Rector of the university.

Early life and education

Stathakis graduated from the University of Athens in 1976 with degree in economics. He continued his studies, graduating in 1978 with a Master's degree in economics, and in 1983 with a Doctorate in economics, both from Newcastle University. His doctoral thesis was titled: "Industrial Development and the Regional Problem: The Case of Greece".

Academic career

Stathakis worked at the Mediterranean Studies Foundation from 1985 to 1986 and at the Computer Technology Institute in Patras from 1986 to 1987. From 1987 to 1988 he worked as a visiting researcher at the Center for Byzantine and Modern Greek Studies, Queens College, City University of New York, and as a visiting scholar from 1992 to 1993 at the Center for European Studies, Harvard University.

In 1988 he joined the staff at the University of Crete as a lecturer. He became an associate professor in 1992 and in 1997 became a full professor of political economy. His teaching focuses on Marxist analysis and economic methodology. Stathakis has also been one of three Vice-Rectors of the University of Crete, but stepped down following the May 2012 legislative election.

Political career

Stathakis was first elected as a Member of the Hellenic Parliament for Chania in the May 2012 Greek legislative election. He was re-elected in the June 2012 legislative election and in the January 2015 legislative election.

Stathakis is reportedly seen as "more market-friendly" than most of his colleagues in Syriza. Alexis Tsipras has reportedly said that Stathakis is "so valuable that if he didn't exist he would have to be invented".

Before Syriza came to power following the 2015 legislative election, Stathakis served as the shadow development minister in the Shadow Cabinet of Alexis Tsipras. In an interview with the Financial Times before the 2015 legislative election, Stathakis set out Syriza's plan to crack down on Greek oligarchs if it won the election.

Following the 2015 legislative election, Stathakis was appointed as the Minister of Economy, Infrastructure, Shipping and Tourism in the cabinet of Alexis Tsipras.

Stathakis was named as a potential replacement for Yanis Varoufakis after he resigned as Minister for Finance on 6 July 2015, following the resounding 'No' vote in the Greek bailout referendum. He was later appointed as the economy minister. During his tenure it was revealed that he failed to report thirty-eight properties and €1.8m in his assets declaration of 2011. A parliamentary committee is investigating the revelations.

Personal life

Stathakis is married to Themis Gekou and has two children.

External links

References

1953 births
Living people
21st-century Greek economists
Syriza politicians
Greek MPs 2012–2014
Politicians from Chania
Greek MPs 2015 (February–August)
Greek MPs 2015–2019
Economy ministers of Greece
Government ministers of Greece
Academic staff of the University of Crete
20th-century Greek economists